The 2014 Pacific Netball series was held in Samoa between 3-8 June 2014.

Results

Table

Final standings

See also
 Pacific Netball Series

References

Pacific
2014
2014 in Oceanian sport
International netball competitions hosted by Samoa
2014 in Cook Islands sport
2014 in Fijian sport
2014 in Papua New Guinean sport
2014 in Samoan sport